Besirin  is a Syrian village located in the Hama Subdistrict of the Hama District in the Hama Governorate.  According to the Syria Central Bureau of Statistics (CBS), Besirin had a population of 4,697 in the 2004 census. Its inhabitants are predominantly Sunni Muslims.

References

Bibliography

 

Populated places in Hama District